Pál Medgyessy (Egercsehi, October 10, 1919 – Budapest, October 8, 1977) was a mathematician, Doctor of Mathematical Sciences (1973).

Biography
He graduated at the University of Budapest as a student of Eötvös József Collegium. He started his career as a trainee at the Institute of Medical Physics at the University of Debrecen. Due to his illness, his scientific work was slow to develop.

He read the Latin-language classics in the original, spoke German, French, and Italian well, and during his captivity he also mastered Russian, so his skills were utilised as an interpreter during the war. He published some of his books in English.

He was an aspirant to the candidate's degree at the Mathematical Research Institute of the Hungarian Academy of Sciences, a student of Alfréd Rényi’s. From 1955 on he was a research associate and scientific advisor at the Institute. He received his doctorate in mathematics from the HAS in 1973.

Research interests
His main research interests were probability, mathematical statistics, and their applications; his results on numerical methods are also remarkable. Many of his papers are in the fields of medicine, biology, chemistry, and spectroscopy. His results on various non-electronic calculators and equipment are noteworthy.

He was an outstanding expert in bibliography, credited with the modernization of the mathematics section of the decimal classification and the preparation of several bibliographies, including those of the works of Frigyes Riesz and Alfréd Rényi.
 
His works on the history of science deal with ancient Babylonian and Egyptian science and the history of Chinese mathematics and astrology.

Major works

In English
 Decompositions of Superposition of Distribution Functions (Bp., 1961), its 1995 edition: 
 Decomposition of Superpositions of Density Functions and Discrete Distributions (New York, 1977). .

In Hungarian
 Valószínűségeloszlás-függvények keverékének felbontása összetevőire ("Decomposition of mixtures of probability distribution functions into its components", Budapest, 1954)
 Valószínűségszámítás ("Probability theory", textbook, authored with Lajos Takács, Budapest, 1957, 1966)
 Sűrűségfüggvények és diszkrét eloszlások szuperpozíciójának felbontása ("Decomposition of density functions and superposition of discrete distributions", Budapest, 1971)
 Rényi Alfréd munkássága ("The Works of Alfréd Rényi", compiled, Budapest, 1971)

References

External links

In English
 A panorama of Hungarian mathematics in the twentieth century (his entry displayed by Google Books)

In Hungarian
 His entry in the Hungarian Biographical Dictionary (Magyar életrajzi lexikon)
 Medgyessy Pál, a sokoldalú tudós matematikus ("Pál Medgyessy, the multi-faceted scholar mathematician", an article by Zoltán Rostás)
  More articles about him in the Calendar of Scientists
 A sokoldalú tudós. Medgyessy Pál emlékezete ("The multi-faceted scholar. Remembering Pál Medgyessy", Magyar Nemzet, November 2, 1977)
 Gazda, István, Jr.: "Az elmúlt év októberében hunyt el Medgyessy Pál…" ("Pál Medgyessy passed away in October last year..."), in Természet Világa ("The World of Nature"), 1978 (vol. 109), issue 11, p. 521

1919 births
1977 deaths
Probability theorists
20th-century Hungarian mathematicians